Edmund Turton may refer to:
Sir Edmund Turton, 1st Baronet (1857–1929), British politician
Edmund Turton (athlete) (born 1932), Olympic runner from Trinidad and Tobago